The International Conference of Marxist–Leninist Parties and Organizations (abbreviations: ICMLPO or CIPOML) is an international organization of anti-revisionist Marxist–Leninist communist parties adhering to the Hoxhaist tradition developed in Communist Albania.

It claims to be the continuation of the international organizations of Communist parties of the 19th and 20th centuries, including the International Workingmen's Association and Comintern. It adheres to the ideas of Karl Marx, Friedrich Engels, Vladimir Lenin, and Joseph Stalin and organizes on the principles of Marxism-Leninism.

The Conference was found in Quito, Ecuador in 1994 and adopted A Communist Declaration to the Workers and Peoples of the World. On XXII Plenary meeting it adopted International platform: on capitalism, the working class and the fight for communism. The ICMLPO holds annual Plenary sessions as well as holding regional meetings in Europe, Americas and Asia. The latest XXVI conference took place in February 2021. The theoretical journal of the Conference, Unity & Struggle, is published every 6 months in many languages.

Member parties and organisations

Observer members

References

External links
 

 
Stalinism
Anti-revisionist internationals
Hoxhaist organizations
Left-wing internationals